The Department of Economic Development is a department in the Government of New Brunswick.  It is charged with stimulating economic prosperity and global competitiveness in the province.

Created in 1944 during war time as the Department of Industry and Reconstruction, the Department has since had several name changes and has been known as the Department of Industry, Department of Economic Growth, and Department of Economic Development, Tourism and Culture.

The department was renamed Business New Brunswick on March 23, 2000 when Premier Bernard Lord restructured the New Brunswick Cabinet. It was created by subdividing the then Department of Economic Development, Tourism and Culture. It was enlarged on October 9, 2001 when it absorbed the Department of Investment and Exports which has also been originally created from Economic Development, Tourism and Culture.

On October 12, 2010, then premier David Alward named a Minister of Economic Development with responsibility for Business New Brunswick.  The name of the department was officially changed to the Department of Economic Development on December 17, 2010.

Since April 1, 2015, provincial Crown corporation Opportunities NB (ONB) has served as New Brunswick’s lead economic development agency mandated with fostering economic and business growth.

Ministers 

*Doucet was minister of industry and reconstruction until 1948 and was thereafter minister of industry and development.

References
Opportunities NB
 Government of New Brunswick, list of Department Ministers 1944-2006 (PDF file)

New Brunswick government departments and agencies
New Brunswick
New Brunswick